Meredith Joy Ostrom is an American actress.  She graduated from the New York University Tisch School of the Arts where she got her BFA degree with a double major in Drama and Fine arts with a minor in Cinema Studies. After graduation she moved to London.  She was linked for years to Duran Duran's Nick Rhodes.

She has donated art to causes such as in her first solo exhibition in March 2009, which was a show in which the majority of the proceeds went to the Youth for Youth international children's charity, the space was donated by Philips de Pury. Donating works to the Gilda Radner cancer research Centre for recovering patients in the New York area, the World Childhood foundation's annual auction and gala, whose patron is Queen Silvia  and Princess Madeline of Sweden. In December 2008 her work was exhibited at the Stanton Barrett Gallery in New York which was a pop up space created by racing driver Stanton Barret and supported by fellow drivers.

On April 27, 2009 Ostrom demonstrated her body painting to an audience of over 500 at Sketch in London's Mayfair.  Appearing in silhouette behind a screen she used her body and various painting techniques to produce a painting which was then revealed to the assembled crowd. The painting was then acquired by Opera Gallery.

In March 2010 her work was included at Vegas Gallery in London's east end, in Keith Coventry's curated, Peep Show a group show of paintings and photography alongside Tracey Emin, Keith Tyson, Alison Jackson, Dan Macmillan, Henry Hudson, Matt Collishaw, Emer O'Brien and George Condo.

In London, Ostrom's paintings are now exhibited and sold in New Bond Street's Opera Gallery, in the company of her favorite modern artists such as Warhol, Picasso, Hirst, Mr. Brainwash, Banksy, Dali and Chagall. She also admits she is influenced by conceptual artist Yoko Ono, with whom she shares a birthday, February 18.
Her work is also currently in One Hyde Park, the Candy and Candy building.
Meredith's works are related to the dialogue of the tension between the female physical form and the idea of colour which represents emotional and intellectual movement.
Many of her paintings focus on her own female physical form impressed onto vividly painted canvas.

She played herself in collaborative and photography art projects and was the face to launch Sky TV's Arts channel, photographed and curated by Rankin which was shown as well on Billboards across London calling it Rankin's Sky TV Street Gallery as well as collaborative photographic art projects with Ellen Von Unwerth for Italian Vogue, Alison Jackson for GQ and Simon Emmet for the arts and culture magazine, Volt.

As an actress she recently played the character Joany, muse to a conceptual artist, in the 2009 film Boogie Woogie, based on the novel written by Danny Moynehan, a satire on the New York and London art worlds, for which Damien Hirst curated the art work in the film. She also appeared in the 2006 films Played and Factory Girl (playing the role of iconic German songbird/muse of Andy Warhol Nico). She starred in the 2005 short film Bizarre Love Triangle, written and directed by George Hickenlooper. She appeared in a 2000 episode of Sex and the City.

Filmography 
London Town (2016) as Rebecca
Men Don't Lie (2010) as Miriam
Boogie Woogie (2009) as Joany
Nine Miles Down (2009) as Susan
The Heavy (2008) as Amanda Mason
Feel the Noise (2007) as Noelia
Factory Girl (2006) as Nico
Played (2006) as Nikki
Bizarre Love Triangle (2005) as Meredith
The Great New Wonderful (2005) as Anita
Naked in London (2005) as Callas
When Will I Be Loved (2004) as Meredith
Murder City as Inger (1 episode, 2004) - Nothing Sacred
Keen Eddie as Dominique (3 episodes, 2003–2004)- Pilot (2003) - Stewardess Keeping Up Appearances and - Inciting Incident(2004)
Love Actually (2003) as Billy's Video Vixen
My Name Is Tanino (2002) as Melissa
'R Xmas (2001) as Elfie
Sex and the City as Lizzie (1 episode, 2000)  What Goes Around Comes Around (2000)
Love Goggles (1999) as Em

Producer:

Boogie Woogie  (2009) (associate producer)
Whiskey School (2005) (associate producer)

References

External links
Official website

Living people
American expatriates in England
American film actresses
American female models
Tisch School of the Arts alumni
Year of birth missing (living people)